The following lists events that happened in 1924 in the United Mexican States.

Incumbents

Federal government
President: Álvaro Obregón (until 30 November); Plutarco Elías Calles (from 1 December)
 Interior Secretary (SEGOB): Romeo Ortega
 Secretary of Foreign Affairs (SRE): Aarón Sáenz Garza
 Communications Secretary (SCT): 
 Education Secretary (SEP):

Supreme Court

 President of the Supreme Court:

Governors
 Aguascalientes: Victorino Medina
 Campeche: Ángel Castillo Lanz 
 Chiapas: Rogelio García Castro
 Chihuahua: Vicente N. Mendoza
 Coahuila: Carlos Garza Castro
 Colima: Gerardo Hurtado Sánchez
 Guanajuato: Jesús S. Soto (interim), Arturo Sierra (interim)
 Guerrero: Francisco Figueroa Mata
 Jalisco: José Guadalupe Zuno
 State of Mexico: Abundio Gómez 
 Michoacán: 
 Morelos: Alfredo Ortega; Amilcar Magaña; Ismael Velazco
 Nayarit: Pascual Villanueva Paredes
 Nuevo León: 
 Oaxaca: Manuel García Vigil
 Puebla: 
 Querétaro: Julián Malo Juvera
 San Luis Potosí: Aurelio Manrique De Lara
 Sinaloa: Ángel Flores
 Sonora: Alejo Bay
 Tabasco: Tomás Garrido Canabal
 Tamaulipas: Benecio López Padilla/Pelayo Quintana/Candelario Garza/Gregorio Garza Salinas
 Veracruz: Adalberto Tejeda Olivares (until November 30); Heriberto Jara Corona (from December 1)
 Yucatán: Felipe Carrillo Puerto/José María Iturralde Traconis
 Zacatecas:

Events
The federal government reports that troops loyal to President Álvaro Obregón have defeated rebels led by Adolfo de la Huerta near Zacualpan.
February 5 – Anti-government rebels retreat from Veracruz when federal troops are victorious at Córdoba.
February 7 – Former president and rebel leader Adolfo de la Huerta escapes by boat to Mérida, Yucatán, after federal troops recapture Veracruz.
February 10 – Federal troops decisively defeat rebels at Ocotlán.
February 15 – Grupo Sonido 13, directed by Julián Carrillo, holds the first concert of microtonal music in Mexico City.
February 24 – Federal troops defeat rebels in the oil region of Tamaulipas.
Land belonging to Mexican President-elect Plutarco Elías Calles is expropriated in accordance with agrarian laws.

Births
January 16 – Katy Jurado, actress (died 2002)
February 29 – Agustín Hernández Navarro, architect and sculptor (died 2022)
March 13 — Raúl Córdoba, international footballer (died 2017)
June 26 – Juan Gómez, footballer (died 2009)
November 13 — Jesús Kumate Rodríguez, physician and politician (died 2018)

Deaths
January 3 — Felipe Carrillo Puerto, journalist, politician and revolutionary (born 1874)
June 10 — Salvador Alvarado, politician and soldier (born 1880)

References

 
1920s in Mexico
Years of the 20th century in Mexico
Mexico
Mexico